Los Agadones is a subcomarca in the comarca of Comarca de Ciudad Rodrigo in the province of Salamanca, Castile and León.  It contains nine municipalities:  Agallas, La Atalaya, Herguijuela, Martiago, Monsagro, El Sahugo, Serradilla del Arroyo, Serradilla del Llano and Zamarra.

References 

Comarcas of the Province of Salamanca